In the 1840 Iowa Territory Council elections, electors selected councilors to serve in the third Iowa Territory Council. All 13 members of the Territory Council were elected. Councilors served one-year terms.

The Iowa Territory existed from July 4, 1838, until December 28, 1846, when Iowa was admitted to the Union as a state. At the time, the Iowa Territory had a Legislative Assembly consisting of an upper chamber (i.e., the Territory Council) and a lower chamber (i.e., the Territory House).

Following the previous election in 1839, Democrats held a majority with seven seats to Whigs' six seats.

To claim a majority of seats, the Whigs needed to net one seat from the Democrats.

The Democrats maintained a majority of seats in the Council following the 1840 general election with the balance of power remaining unchanged with the Democrats holding seven seats and the Whigs having six seats. Whig Councilor Mortimer Phillips Bainbridge was chosen as the President of the third Territory Council to succeed Democratic Councilor Stephen P. Hempstead in that leadership position.

Summary of Results 

Source:

Detailed Results
NOTE: The Iowa General Assembly does not contain detailed vote totals for Territory Council elections in 1840.

See also
 Elections in Iowa

External links
District boundaries for the Council were redrawn before the 1840 general election:
Iowa Territory Council Districts 1838-1840 map
Iowa Territory Council Districts 1840-1844 map

References

Iowa Council
Iowa
Iowa Senate elections